April Fools' Day is a notable day celebrated on April 1, when many people play practical jokes and hoaxes on each other.

April Fool's Day or April Fools' Day may also refer to:

April Fools' Day (1954 film), a 1954 French film
 April Fool's Day (1986 film), a 1986 horror film directed by Fred Walton
 April Fool's Day (2008 film), a remake of this film
 April Fool's Day, the original title of the horror film Slaughter High (1986)
 April Fool's  Day, a 1997 TV film starring Bill Bailey
 April Fool's Day (novel), 1993 novel by Bryce Courtnay
 "April Fool's Day" (Hey Arnold), an episode of Hey Arnold
 "April Fool's Day" (Roseanne), an episode of Roseanne

See also
 April Fool (disambiguation)
 Fool's Day (disambiguation)
 April Fools' Day Request for Comments
 "Fools in April", an episode of SpongeBob SquarePants
 All Fools Day (album), a 1985 album by the Saints